A secretary, administrative assistant, executive assistant, program assistant, project assistant, personal assistant, or other similarly titled person is a person whose work consists of supporting management, including executives, using a variety of project management, program evaluation, communication, business administration, and/or organizational skills within the area of administration. There is a diverse array of work experiences attainable within the administrative support field, ranging between internship, entry-level, associate, junior, mid-senior, and senior level pay bands with positions in nearly every industry, especially among white-collar careers.   

Some high-level secretaries, administrative assistants, or executive assistants in the associate, junior, mid-senior, and senior level pay bands or those in an entry-level position that requires specialized knowledge preferably or explicitly acquired through a bachelor's degree (e.g. BA, BS, BBA), a master's degree (e.g. MA, MS, MBA, MPP, MPA, MPH, MLIS), or even a doctoral degree (e.g. JD), in a field pertinent to the organization's industry are specialized secretaries in the general sense while others can be further sub-categorized as  program assistants (who's duties lean more heavily towards program evaluation than other administrative support duties) both of which generally assist senior executives and/or actively participate in the professional service work of the organization such has having a hands-on involvement on the production of deliverables. Some other positions such as legislative assistants, paralegals, judicial law clerks, clerks of the court, medical assistants, and medical scribes that require bachelor's, master's, or doctoral degrees to practice, have taken up duties identical to that of specialized secretaries and vice versa where specialized secretaries have taken up some of the research and recordkeeping tasks of executives they assist such as working on deliverables or conduct similar professional duties.  

The functions of a personal assistant may be entirely carried out to assist one other employee or may be for the benefit of more than one. In other situations, a secretary is an officer of a society or organization who deals with correspondence, admits new members, and organizes official meetings and events. However, this role should not be confused with the role of an executive secretary, cabinet secretary such as cabinet members who hold the title of "secretary", or company secretary, all which differ from an administrative assistant.

Duties and functions
A secretary, also known as a personal assistant (PA), program assistant, or administrative assistant, can have many administrative duties. The title "secretary" is not used as often today as in decades past, and responsibilities have evolved in response to the technological age, requiring knowledge in software such as the Microsoft Office suite of applications. The duties may vary according to the nature and size of the company or organization, and in the most generic or original sense, might include managing budgets, bookkeeping, attending telephone calls, handling visitors, maintaining websites, travel arrangements, event planning, and preparing expense reports. Secretaries might also manage all the administrative details of running a high-level conference or meeting and be responsible for arranging the catering for a lunch meeting. Often executives will ask their assistant to take the minutes at meetings and prepare meeting documents for review. In addition to the minutes, the secretary may be responsible for keeping all of the official records of a company or organization. A secretary is also regarded as an "office manager".  Today in the 21st Century, many secretaries, administrative assistants, and program assistants have in effect joined the ranks of the professional service, unlike the secretaries of the 20th Century who were categorized under the low-skilled and unskilled labor force. Today, they conduct research, briefings, write memoranda, content writing, handle project management, program evaluation, stakeholder management, customer service duties, devise and maintain office systems including data management and filing, carry out background research and present findings, produce documents like white papers and gray literature, carry out specific projects, take on some of the manager's responsibilities, get involved in decision-making processes, handle public relations tasks, and/or logistics and procurement along with a wide range of other duties related to their specific industry. Secretaries in some fields may be required to have extensive professional knowledge. Accordingly, duties for these assistants may be more specialized. For example, legal administrative assistants also known as legal secretaries may need to have a thorough understanding of legal terminology and procedural law, paralegals in addition would need to acquire legal research skills, know how to analyze and summarize depositions, prepare and answer interrogatories, and draft procedural motions and other routine legal briefs; legislative assistants would need to be educated in political science or other adjacent fields of study and know how to monitor pending legislation, conducting research, legislative analysis, legislative research, legal research, policy analysis, drafting legislation, giving advice and counsel, and making recommendations; while medical assistants and medical scribes would need to be well-versed in the health sciences, health policy, public health, dealing with health insurance companies, and reading medical reports; law clerks and clerks of the court would need to hold a post-graduate doctoral degree in law known as a Juris Doctor (JD) and be or have the ability to be a practicing lawyer that has been admitted to the bar.

In a place of employment, many job descriptions and job titles overlap. However, while administrative assistant is a generic term, not necessarily implying directly working for a superior, a secretary in most cases is usually the key person for all administrative tasks, and often referred to as the "gate keeper".  Other titles describing jobs similar to or overlapping those of the traditional secretary are Office Coordinator, Executive Assistant, Office Manager and Administrative Professional.

List of job titles synonymous with or similar to secretary: secretary, administrative professional, administrative assistant, executive assistant, administrative officer, administrative support specialist, clerk, military assistant, military aid, management assistant, office secretary, program assistant, program analyst, project assistant, program asociate, personal aid, body man/body women, personal secretary, or personal assistant.
In previous decades, especially in the 20th century and before, at the most basic level a secretary was usually an audio typist or amanuensis with a small number of administrative roles.  A good command of the prevailing office language and the ability to type is essential. At higher grades and with more experience they begin to take on additional roles and spend more of their time maintaining physical and electronic files, being a data entry clerk, dealing with the post, photocopying, emailing clients, ordering stationery and answering telephones. A more skilled executive assistant may be required to type at high speeds using technical or foreign languages, organize diaries, itineraries and meetings and carry out administrative duties which may include accountancy or financial accounting. A secretary / executive assistant may also control access to a manager, thus becoming an influential and trusted aide. Executive assistants are available for contact during off hours by new electronic communication methods for consultations. 
Specialized secretaries at higher levels and Program Assistants, who today make up the bulk of administrative professionals, have a lot more duties and require higher education  than what secretaries of decades past needed to enter the profession. Specialized secretaries can be subdivided into multiple categories and job titles such as Medical Secretaries, Legal Secretaries, Personal Assistants, and Program Assistants to name a few. These positions often require higher education or even post-graduate education. In certain situations, other positions such as legislative assistants, paralegals, judicial law clerks, clerks of the court, medical assistants, and medical scribes, that require bachelor's, master's, or doctoral degrees to practice have taken up duties identical to that of specialized secretaries.
The largest difference between a generalized secretary and skilled executive assistants is that the executive assistant is required to be able to interact extensively with the general public, vendors, customers, and any other person or group that the executive is responsible to interact with. As the level that the executive interacts with increases so does the level of skill required in the executive assistant that works with the executive. Those executive assistants that work with corporate officers must be capable of emulating the style, corporate philosophy, and corporate persona of the executive for which they work. In the modern workplace the advancement of the executive assistants is codependent on the success of the executive and the ability of both to make the job performance of the team seamless whereas the job place evaluation is reflective of each other's performance executive secretary for now.

This should be distinguished from the Company secretary, a senior role within a company responsible for compliance with statutory and regulatory requirements.

Executive assistant

Civilian 
The work of an executive assistant (sometimes called a management assistant) differs a great deal from that of an administrative assistant. In many organizations, an executive assistant is a high-ranking position in the administrative hierarchy. Executive assistants work for a company officer or executive (at both private and public institutions), and possess the authority to make crucial decisions affecting the direction of such organizations. As such, executive assistants play a role in decision-making and policy setting.  The executive assistant performs the usual roles of managing correspondence, preparing research, and communication, often with one or more administrative assistants or scheduling assistants who report to him or her. The executive assistant also acts as the "gatekeeper", understanding in varying degree the requirements of the executive, and with an ability through this understanding to decide which scheduled events, meetings, teleconferences, or e-mails are most appropriate for allocation of the executive's time.

An executive assistant may, from time to time, act as proxy for the executives, representing him/her/them in meetings or communications and project managing the production of reports or other deliverables in the absence of the executive. An executive assistant differs from an administrative assistant (a job which is often part of the career path of an executive assistant) in that they are expected to possess a higher degree of business acumen, be able to manage projects, as well as have the ability to influence others on behalf of the executive. In the past, executive assistants were required to have a high school diploma only, but increasingly jobs are requiring a bachelor's degree of any field of study or when complying with educational requirements within their given industry, may require specialized knowledge in a specific fields of study through a bachelor's degree pertinent to the employer's industry or division's role within the organization.

Military 

In the U.S. Department of Defense, the title of military assistant (MA) or executive assistant (EA) is typically held by Army, Air Force, and Marine Corps colonels, lieutenant colonels, and senior majors and Navy captains, commanders and senior lieutenant commanders who are in direct support of the Secretary of Defense, Deputy Secretary of Defense and other civilian defense officials down to the level of a Deputy Assistant Secretary of Defense, as well as general officers or flag officers.

The Secretary of Defense also has a lieutenant general or vice admiral as his/her senior military assistant.

Like their civilian counterparts, EAs are also a resource in decision-making, policy setting, and will have leadership oversight of the entire military and civilian staff supporting the civilian official, general officer, or flag officer.  EAs are often interchangeable with other senior military officers of equivalent rank holding the title of chief of staff in other service organizations headed by a flag officer or general officer. In the case of unified combatant commands and service major commands, the Chief of Staff is often a general officer or flag officer, typically at the 1-star or 2-star level, but  should not be confused with the 4-star officers holding the title of Chief of Staff of the Army or Chief of Staff of the Air Force.

Education, training, and entering the profession

21st century 
In the United States, a variety of skills and adaptability to new situations is necessary. As such, a four-year bachelor's degree is often preferred and a two-year associate degree is usually a requirement, in any field of study unless specified by employers to comply with education requirements within their given industry, although work experience can substitute education if the position does not require specialized knowledge in a specific field of study pertinent to the employer's industry or division's role within the organization. Another option taken with or without higher education is to get a professional certification from a national association that self-regulates the secretarial and administrative assistance industry, in which a professional certification may substitute higher education if the person does not have a bachelor's degree or an associate degree, or in order to substitute work experience for a person with a higher education degree but with limited experience in an administrative support role. Many of these job titles today in the 21st century found among Millennial, Gen Z, and younger Gen X adults, require specialized education and skills mostly acquired through a bachelor's degree (e.g. BA, BS, BBA) level of education and in some cases a master's degree (e.g. MA, MS, MBA, MPP, MPA, MPH, MLIS) or doctoral degree (e.g. JD) level of education including even education specifically in a field pertinent to the organization's industry or division's purview because many in these positions today actively participate in the work of their employer such as having a hands-on involvement on the production of deliverables or conduct other professional duties similar to that of the executives they assist unlike the secretaries of decades past.

19th–20th centuries 
During the 20th Century among Baby Boomers, some older Gen X adults, and previous generations it was common for secretaries to enter the profession only having obtained a high school diploma supplemented by on-the-job training with no formal post-secondary education, a higher education degree, or previous professional service experience, unlike successor generations in the 21st century.

The entry requirements for the profession of secretary in the 19th and 20th centuries were low: having shorthand and typing skills were the only skills required for the position. After finishing high school or after reaching the allowed age for workforce entry, if needed it was possible take courses lasting several weeks, to learn how to write shorthand and typing, which advanced entry into a shorthand or writing pool secretary position; these schools or private schools offering courses in typing, for example, existed as early as the 1880s.

Origin
From the Renaissance until the late 19th century, men involved in the daily correspondence and the activities of the powerful had assumed the title of secretary. 

With time, like many titles, the term was applied to more and varied functions, leading to compound titles to specify various secretarial work better, like general secretary or financial secretary. Just "secretary" remained in use either as an abbreviation when clear in the context or for relatively modest positions such as administrative assistant of the officer(s) in charge, either individually or as member of a secretariat. As such less influential posts became more feminine and common with the multiplication of bureaucracies in the public and private sectors, new words were also coined to describe them, such as personal assistant.

In the 1840s and 1850s, commercial schools were emerging to train male and female students the skills needed to work in a clerical position. In 1870, Sir Isaac Pitman founded a school where students could qualify as shorthand writers to "professional and commercial men". Originally, this school was only for male students. In 1871, there were more than 150 such schools operating in the United States, a number that grew to as many as 500 by the 1890s. 

In the 1880s, with the invention of the typewriter, more women began to enter the field and during the upcoming years, especially since World War I, the role of secretary has been primarily associated with women. By the 1930s, fewer men were entering the field of secretaries.

In an effort to promote professionalism among United States secretaries, the National Secretaries Association was created in 1942. Today, this organization is known as the International Association of Administrative Professionals (IAAP). The organization developed the first standardized test for office workers called the Certified Professional Secretaries Examination (CPS). It was first administered in 1951. 

By the mid-20th century, the need for secretaries was great and offices and organizations featured large secretarial pools.  In some cases the demand was great enough to spur secretaries being recruited from overseas; in particular, there was often a steady demand for young British women to come to the U.S. and fill temporary or permanent secretarial positions.  Several organizations were created to assist secretaries from foreign lands, including the Society of International Secretaries and the Association of British Secretaries in America.

In 1952, Mary Barrett, president of the National Secretaries Association, C. King Woodbridge, president of Dictaphone Corporation, and American businessman Harry F. Klemfuss created a special Secretary's Day holiday, to recognize the hard work of the staff in the office. The holiday caught on, and during the fourth week of April is now celebrated in offices all over the world.

In the 20th century, with the spread of the typewriter, shorthand saw competition from steno-typing. Typing thus became the prerogative of women, widows or relatively well-educated young girls, originally from the middle class or the petty bourgeoisie, then from working-class backgrounds with the rise of the profession between the two world wars, which saw the women seize these innovations. 

Secretary's Day was later renamed and expanded into Administrative Professional's Week to highlight the increased responsibility of today's secretary and other administrative workers in the professional service, and to avoid embarrassment to those who believe that "secretary" refers only to women or to unskilled workers as was typical in the 20th Century.

Until recent years, the profession of secretary in the original sense was often subject, in the collective imagination, to stereotypes and pejorative connotations. Indeed, secretarial work was easily associated with low-value, thankless, and badly paid tasks, such as serving coffee to superiors, making photocopies or filing menial documents. In addition, the profession was once exercised almost exclusively by women as a pink-collar job and was considered part of the unskilled labor force in previous decades, but in the 21st century many employers began re-classifying many professional service entry-level white-collar jobs, including ones historically held by men in decades past, as secretary, administrative assistant, or program assistant roles.

Employers have long preferred unmarried women, a notion that resonated with governments and unions when jobs were scarce in tough economic times. During the 1930s in the United States, both a number of states and the federal government attempted to legislate married women out of the labor market, finding support from unions promoting "family wages"—a wage equal to a married woman husband had enough income to support both a household chore wife and a flock of children. All legislative initiatives that wanted to create a legal basis for such discrimination ultimately failed. But even without a legal basis, employers tried to exclude married women from employment. In a 1940 survey, 40 percent of 485 US companies surveyed said they had clear policies barring married women from working for them. The reason given was that married women would soon leave their positions anyway, and if they stayed in their positions, because of their domestic and family responsibilities, they would not give their paid work the attention that an unmarried woman would. Many of the women working in the office therefore lied about their marital status. Until the mid-1970s, when women's career opportunities began to expand, shorthand and typing skills offered them the chance to find a job with those skills, even if they had completed education that would have given them other jobs had it not been for gender discrimination.

Etymology 
The term is derived from the Latin word , "to distinguish" or "to set apart", the passive participle meaning "having been set apart", with the eventual connotation of something private or confidential, as with the English word secret. A  was a person, therefore, overseeing business confidentially, usually for a powerful individual (a king, pope, etc.). As the duties of a modern secretary often still include the handling of confidential information, the literal meaning of their title still holds true.

See also
Clerk
Cabinet secretary or Department secretary
Office lady
Receptionist

References

Further reading
 
 
 The debate theorical-methodological in field of secretariat: diversities and singularities
 Educational handbooks for professions occupied by females in the 1960s and 1970s.

External links

 American Society of Administrative Professionals
 Administrative Professional Resources
 iaap - International Association of Administrative Professionals

Office and administrative support occupations